Spiers Nunatak is an isolated nunatak lying 8 nautical miles (15 km) west-northwest of Mount Brecher on the north side of Quonset Glacier, in the Wisconsin Range, Horlick Mountains. Mapped by United States Geological Survey (USGS) from surveys and U.S. Navy air photos, 1960–64. Named by Advisory Committee on Antarctic Names (US-ACAN) for Raymond R. Spiers, cook with the Byrd Station winter party, 1959.

Nunataks of Marie Byrd Land